David Webster may refer to:

In sport
 Dave Webster (1937–2006), American football player
 David Webster (cricketer) (born 1946), English cricketer
 David Webster (footballer) (born 1989), Irish professional footballer
 David Webster (rowing) (born 1987), Australian rowing cox
 David P. Webster (born 1928), Scottish author, historian, and promoter of the Highland games internationally

In other fields
 David Kenyon Webster (1922–1961), American soldier, journalist and author
 David L. Webster (1888–1976), American physicist in early X-ray theory
 David Webster (anthropologist) (1945–1989), South African anthropologist
 David Webster (architect) (1885–1952), Scottish-Canadian architect
 David Webster (opera manager) (1903–1971), British general administrator of the Royal Opera House in London, 1946–1970
 David Webster (politician) (1923–1969), British Conservative Member of Parliament for Weston-Super-Mare
 David Webster, Australian TV producer for Ambence Entertainment, creator and writer for Erky Perky
 David P. Webster (born 1928), Scottish author, historian, and promoter of the Highland games internationally